Cefpirome is a fourth-generation cephalosporin. Trade names include Cefrom, Keiten, Broact, and Cefir. Cefpirome is considered highly active against Gram-negative bacteria, including Pseudomonas aeruginosa, and Gram-positive bacteria.

Spectrum of bacterial susceptibility and resistance 
Bacteroides fragilis, enterococci, Pseudomonas spp. and staphylococci are resistant to cefpirome sulfate, and some Haemophilus spp. and pneumococci have developed resistance to it to varying degrees.

References

Cephalosporin antibiotics
Thiazoles
Ketoximes